Evernote is a note-taking and task management application. It is developed by the Evernote Corporation, headquartered in Redwood City, California. It is intended for archiving and creating notes in which photos, audio and saved web content can be embedded. Notes are stored in virtual "notebooks" and can be tagged, annotated, edited, searched, and exported.

Evernote is available on Android, iOS, macOS, and Microsoft Windows, as well as a web client. It offers free and paid plans for use.

Company

Operations 
Evernote is a privately owned company headquartered in Redwood City, California. Its current CEO, Francesco Patarnello, has been in his position since January 2023 following the acquisition by Bending Spoons. Evernote has domestic offices in Austin, San Diego, and Bothell, Washington. It has international offices in India, Switzerland, Chile, and Japan. As of Feb 2023, the company employed nearly 400 people.

History 
After being founded in 2000 by RussianAmerican computer entrepreneur Stepan Pachikov, EverNote Corporation ('EverNote' stylized with a capital 'N' at the time) started marketing software for Windows desktop PCs, tablet PCs and handheld devices like the handwriting recognition software ritePen and the note-taking and web clipping application EverNote (also with a capital 'N'), a Windows application which stored notes on an 'infinite roll of paper'. Under new CEO Phil Libin, the company shifted its focus to the Web, smartphones and also the Apple Mac, starting with Evernote (now with lower-case 'n') 3.0 in 2008. The Evernote Web service launched into open beta on June 24, 2008, and reached 11 million users in July 2011. In October 2010, the company raised a US$20 million funding round led by DoCoMo Capital with participation from Morgenthaler Ventures and Sequoia Capital. Since then, the company raised an additional $50 million in funding led by Sequoia Capital and Morgenthaler Ventures, and another $70 million in funding led by Meritech Capital and CBC Capital. On November 30, 2012, Evernote raised another $85 million in funding led by AGC Equity Partners/m8 Capital and Valiant Capital Partners. On November 9, 2014, Evernote raised an additional $20 million in funding from Nikkei, Inc.

On May 7, 2013, TechCrunch reported that Evernote launched Yinxiang Biji Business into the Chinese market at the Global Mobile Internet Conference.

Linda Kozlowski was named chief operating officer of Evernote in June 2015, but left before the end of the year.

Libin stepped down as CEO in July 2015 and was replaced by former Google Glass executive Chris O'Neill, but remained Executive Chairman. In October 2015, Evernote announced it would lay off 18 percent of its workforce and close three out of 10 global offices. In September 2016, Libin stepped down as executive chairman. In February 2017, CEO O'Neill said in a blog post that the business was cash-flow positive.

In August 2018, Chief Technical Officer Anirban Kundu, Chief Financial Officer Vincent Toolan, Chief Product Officer Erik Wrobel, and head of HR Michelle Wagner left the company. Wrobel and Wagner both joined in 2016. On September 18, 2018, 54 employees—about 15 percent of the workforce—were laid off. In a blog post, O'Neill said, "After a successful 2017, I set incredibly aggressive goals for Evernote in 2018. Though we have steadily grown, we committed too many resources too quickly. We built up areas of our business in ways that have proven to be inefficient. Going forward, we are streamlining certain functions, like sales, so we can continue to speed up and scale others, like product development and engineering."

On October 29, 2018, Evernote announced that Ian Small, former CEO of TokBox, would replace O'Neill as CEO of Evernote.

In January 2023, Evernote was acquired by Bending Spoons, an Italian mobile app development company. At the same time Francesco Patarnello took over as CEO from Ian Small.

Architecture

Coding and versions 
In 2010, the programming language used to write Evernote's software was changed from C# for version 3.5 to C++ in version 4.0 to improve performance.

Data entry 
As well as the keyboard entry of typed notes, Evernote supports image capture from cameras on supported devices, and the recording of voice notes. In some situations, text that appears in captured images can be recognized using OCR and annotated. Evernote also supports touch and tablet screens with handwriting recognition. Evernote web-clipping plugins are available for the most popular Internet browsers that allow marked sections of webpages to be captured and clipped to Evernote. If no section of a webpage has been highlighted, Evernote can clip the full page. Evernote also supports the ability to e-mail notes to the service, allowing for automated note entry via e-mail rules or filters.

Where suitable hardware is available, Evernote can automatically add geolocation tags to notes.

As of November 2018, Evernote Pro integrates directly with Google Drive, Microsoft Outlook, Microsoft Teams, and Slack, and Evernote Pro adds an integration with Salesforce. All versions of Evernote also support integrations through IFTTT and Zapier. In 2013, Evernote deprecated its direct integration with Twitter in favor of these third-party services.

Data storage and access 
On supported operating systems, Evernote allows users to store and edit notes on their local machine, using a SQLite database in Windows.

Users with Internet access and an Evernote account can also have their notes automatically synchronized with a master copy held on Evernote's servers. This approach lets a user access and edit their data across multiple machines and operating system platforms, but still view, input and edit data when an Internet connection is not available. However, notes stored on Evernote servers are not encrypted.

Where Evernote client software is not available, online account-holders can access their note archive via a web interface or through a media device. The service also allows selected files to be shared for viewing and editing by other users.

The Evernote software can be downloaded and used as "stand-alone" software without using the online portion of an Evernote account (online registration is required for initial setup, however), but it will not be able to upload files to the Evernote server, or use the server to synchronize or share files between different Evernote installations. Also, no image or Image-PDF (Premium only) recognition and indexing will take place if the software is used entirely offline.

Accounts 

Evernote has various account options including free and paid tiers. As of 2023, the paid tiers are named Personal and Professional. Previous Evernote tier names include Plus, Premium, and Business.
Free, Personal and Professional Evernote accounts have a maximum limit of 100,000 notes. Free users can create up to 250 notebooks while individual paid users have a notebook maximum of 1,000.

Free accounts have a 60 GB upload limit each month. Personal accounts have a 1 GB monthly upload limit, and also include such features as offline notes on mobile devices and the ability to search texts within images.

Accounts on the Professional tier have a 20 GB upload limit per month, can export notes as PDF files, and can forward emails directly into Evernote. The free service does not make files available offline on iOS and Android devices; while sometimes they are available from cache, editing these files can cause conflicts when synchronizing.

In June 2016, Evernote announced the limitation for users of its free Basic account to two devices per year and raised prices for its premium service tiers. Non-paying Evernote users are able to sync notes between two devices. 

From early April 2018, Evernote Plus was no longer available for purchase; however, users who currently have the Plus subscription can maintain it as long as their subscription is still active.

Supported platforms 

Evernote clients are available for Android, iOS (iPad, iPhone, and iPod Touch), macOS, Microsoft Windows, and Web. Additionally, portable versions of Evernote are available for flash drives and U3 drives. There is no officially supported native clients for BSD or Linux, but the company provides an API for external Linux clients.

There is substantial variation in supported features on different platforms. For example, it is possible to edit Rich Text Format and sketches on Windows, while on Apple Macintosh it is possible to edit rich text, but only view sketches.

Web clipping support is installed by default on the Internet Explorer and Safari browsers when the Evernote software is installed under Windows or macOS. Evernote web-clipping plugins are available for the Firefox, Google Chrome, Opera, and Yandex browsers.

The Evernote email-clipper is automatically installed in Microsoft Office Outlook if the desktop version is installed on the same computer. There is also a Thunderbird email plugin.

Apps and tools

Scannable 
Scannable captures paper quickly, transforming it into high-quality scans ready to save or share.

Skitch 
Skitch is a free screenshot editing and sharing utility for OS X, iOS, Windows, and Android. The app permits the user to add shapes and text to an image, and then share it online. Images can also be exported to various image formats. Originally developed by Plasq, Skitch was acquired by Evernote on August 18, 2011. On December 17, 2015, Evernote announced that it will be ending support for Skitch for Windows, Windows Touch, iOS, and Android on January 22, 2016. Evernote said it will continue to offer Skitch for Mac.

Web Clipper 
Evernote Web Clipper is a simple browser extension that lets a user capture full-page articles, images, selected text, important emails, and any web page.

Partnerships

Blinkist 
The book-summarizing service Blinkist offers members to synchronize their highlighted text passages to Evernote. This happens in notes for each book with the title of the book as the note title.

Deutsche Telekom 
On March 25, 2013, Evernote announced a partnership with Deutsche Telekom to provide German customers with free access to Evernote Premium for one year. In January 2014 the partnership was expanded to additional European markets.

Moleskine 

In August 2012, Moleskine partnered with Evernote to produce a digital-friendly notebook with specially designed pages and stickers for smartphone syncing.

Samsung 
All Samsung Galaxy Note 3 phablets included a free one-year subscription to Evernote Premium.

Telefónica Digital 
On August 13, 2013, The New York Times reported that Telefónica Digital and Evernote entered into a global partnership agreement, giving Brazilian customers free access to Evernote Premium for one year. Under this global deal Telefónica users in Costa Rica, Guatemala, Panama, the UK and Spain were also offered the promotion.

Incidents

Data loss 
The service has experienced several cases of losing customer data.

Denial-of-service attacks 
On June 11, 2014, Evernote suffered a crippling distributed denial-of-service attack that prevented customers from accessing their information; the attackers demanded a ransom, which Evernote refused to pay. A denial-of-service attack on August 8, 2014, resulted in a brief period of downtime for evernote.com; service was quickly restored.

Security breach 
On March 2, 2013, Evernote revealed that hackers had gained access to their network and been able to access user information, including usernames, email addresses, and hashed passwords. All users were asked to reset their passwords. In the wake of this, Evernote accelerated plans to implement an optional two-factor authentication for all users.

Privacy controversy 
In December 2016, Evernote announced its privacy policy would be changing in January 2017, leading to claims the policy allowed employees of the firm to access users' content in some situations. In response to the concerns, Evernote apologized and announced the policy would not be implemented, and that its employees would not have access to users' content unless users opted in.

Evernote v10 controversy 
In late 2020, Evernote released Evernote v10, written from scratch in the Electron framework, to replace older versions on multiple platforms. Some users noted the new app was much slower than the previous Windows and iOS versions, had  many features removed, and did not work with some default keyboard layouts, including Turkish, Latvian, and Polish, due to conflict of hardcoded key bindings.

See also 
 Comparison of notetaking software
 List of personal information managers

References

External links 

Note-taking software
Web annotation
Cloud storage
Proprietary cross-platform software
Mobile software
Companies based in Redwood City, California
Android (operating system) software
BlackBerry software
IOS software
Symbian software
American companies established in 2007
Windows Phone software
Data synchronization
Internet properties established in 2007
Privately held companies based in California
Webby Award winners
Collaborative real-time editors
File hosting
Presentation software
Online word processors
Online office suites
WatchOS software
2023 mergers and acquisitions